Buhigwe Ward is an administrative ward in Buhigwe District  of Kigoma Region of Tanzania. In 2016 the Tanzania National Bureau of Statistics report there were 16,757 people in the ward, from 15,224 in 2012.

Villages / neighborhoods 
The ward has 4 villages and 16 hamlets.

 Buhigwe 
 Buyongwa
 Msuka ‘A’
 Msuka ‘B’
 Rubumba
 Nyankoronko
 Bujuru
 Kifulifuli
 Kigabika
 Nyakibingo
 Mulera
 Kimazi
 Lulalo
 Lusange
 Mzenga
 Kavomo 
 Kitagata
 Kitulo
 Munyanga
 Nyandera

References

Buhigwe District
Wards of Kigoma Region